Pulaskiville is an unincorporated community in Morrow County, in the U.S. state of Ohio.

History
Pulaskiville was laid out in 1834. A post office was established at Pulaskiville in 1838, and remained in operation until 1907. In the 1910s, Pulaskiville had two churches and a country store.

References

Unincorporated communities in Morrow County, Ohio
1834 establishments in Ohio
Populated places established in 1834
Unincorporated communities in Ohio